Harold Henry Hicks (December 10, 1900 — August 14, 1965) was a Canadian professional ice hockey player who played 90 games in the National Hockey League with the Montreal Maroons, Detroit Cougars, and Detroit Falcons between 1928 and 1931. The rest of his career, which lasted between 1917 and 1934, was spent in various minor leagues. He was born in Sillery, Quebec.

Career statistics

Regular season and playoffs

External links
 
Obituary at LostHockey.com

1900 births
1965 deaths
Canadian ice hockey defencemen
Detroit Cougars players
Detroit Falcons players
Detroit Olympics (IHL) players
Ice hockey people from Quebec
London Tecumsehs players
Montreal Maroons players
People from Sainte-Foy–Sillery–Cap-Rouge
Stratford Nationals players